, better known as just Mitsurugi, is a fictional character in the Soulcalibur series of fighting games by Namco. He is a mainstay and one of the most iconic characters in the franchise as one of only four characters to appear as a playable character in every installment since 1995's Soul Edge. In the games' lore, Mitsurugi is a master swordsman turned wandering mercenary from Japan ever looking for the ultimate sword and a challenge, who is a rival of Taki and Algol and the enemy of Setsuka.

Mitsurugi quickly became and then remained one of the most iconic and popular Soulcalibur characters, also often having been noted as a well-balanced fighter in terms of gameplay. In the first Soulcalibur, he has been replaced in the Korean version by Arthur who later became a standalone character in Soulcalibur III.

Appearances 
In the backstory of Soul Edge, Heishiro is an orphaned son of a Japanese farmer, who after suffering years of witnessing his homeland being ravaged by bandits and war, decided to take up swordsmanship. At the age of 14, having picked up a sword and the last name Mitsurugi, he went to train under the Murakami clan. Mitsurugi, noted as a great warrior, received numerous commendations and rose in the ranks, but his only true desire was a worthy opponent. After leaving the Murakami clan, Mitsurugi continued to fight in the great civil war in Japan as a hired mercenary. Having originally dismissed the firearm as a novelty, he was shocked to see the riflemen obliterate the Takeda cavalry at the Battle of Nagashino. He decided he needed to find a stronger weapon for himself: the magic sword of legend, Soul Edge.

Mitsurugi encountered the female ninja Taki during this time, but was unable to find any trace of the legendary "Hero's Sword". In his frustration at finding no signs of Soul Edge, he returned home and challenged Teppou Hei, a man wielding the tanegashima, to a duel.  However, Mitsurugi suffered an embarrassing defeat, leaving him with a scar of a gunshot wound on his right shoulder and forcing him to depart in shame on a second quest to perfect his swordsmanship so that he might eventually defeat the gun. It was during this quest that he learned of the Azure Knight, Nightmare, who terrorized Europe with a sword deemed invincible, and set out after him in order to find what he considered a worthy challenge (this being his motivation through the remainder of the series since Soulcalibur). Nightmare's trail eventually disappeared, but Mitsurugi was unwilling to give up, and gradually improved his fighting style to the point riflemen were no longer a threat. Returning from his quest, Mitsurugi challenged Teppou Hei again, but this time Mitsurugi managed to kill the man with a single strike with his sword.

Four years later, during the events of Soulcalibur II, Mitsurugi stumbled upon the trail of Soul Edge while visiting a castle in Xiwei, where a mysterious dying man, after being saved by him from a group of assassins, handed him a shard of the cursed blade. Although skeptical at first, Mitsurugi accepted the gift. Soon afterward, an incident occurred in which a servant of the Emperor of Ming marched to the castle, demanding the "Hero's Sword", and was slain when he refused to leave without it. Mitsurugi sensed that war was coming, but Soul Edge meant nothing to him. He had crossed countless battlefields, defeating every conceivable enemy, even those with rifles. What had once been his greatest enemy was none of his concern, as it no longer proved to be a threat. His only concern was with finding an opponent stronger than himself. Wondering what was happening in Japan at that time, and whether or not he could have a final showdown with Taki, he decided to return to his homeland.

By the time of Soulcalibur III and Soulcalibur IV, the Murakami clan, with whom Mitsurugi stayed upon his return, refused to join with Toyotomi Hideyoshi, choosing instead to protect their existence as fierce pirates and rulers of the sea. Since Mitsurugi could find no trace of Taki, he went to aid the Murakami and aided them in their naval victory. Soon, he learned of the arrival of Nightmare, whom he had lost track of before. Mitsurugi left the Murakami and went to the West again. Ever-searching for a worthy adversary to test his skills, Mitsurugi journeyed to Ostrheinsburg, where he entered a chaotic alternate dimension and faced the Hero King, Algol, high atop a colossal tower. The two warriors clashed when suddenly Algol disappeared, along with the tower and all their surroundings—a dimensional convergence had warped Mitsurugi back to reality before the duel could be decided. He had also unknowingly make rival with Setsuka, after he mortally wounded her master during a battle that eventually led to his death, although he did not realize it until they fight sometime during the events of Soulcalibur IV, at which he defeated her by stunning Setsuka with a punch, but lost his katana Shishi-Oh in the battle.

In Soulcalibur V, after the warring period of Japan had ended, Mitsurugi has settled a quiet life as a farmer for seventeen years. He regains his fighting spirit when he heard about Soul Calibur and goes on a journey to once again continue the battle with Algol that was left unfinished years before.

A young Mitsurugi returns in the reboot/altered timeline-themed game Soulcalibur VI. It was revealed that his failed attempt to fight Nightmare is because Taki was sent by Edge Master to keep him away from end having an awful encounter with the Azure Knight. Misturugi made a friendly rivalry with a universe-displaced The Witcher Geralt of Rivia, and his long waited rival who is also his counterpart from SNK Corporation, Samurai Shodown’s protagonist Haohmaru.

Mitsurugi also appeared in Namco × Capcom as a playable character along with Taki, with whom he makes a temporary alliance there. He also appears as a limited card in Outcast Odyssey. Yuri Lowell from the Tales series can wear Mitsurugi's costume as his alternate outfit. He is also referenced in Ridge Racer 6 with the car named Mitsurugi Meltfire.

Character design 
Soulcalibur producer Motohiro Okubo described Mitsurugi as the character who "naturally plays the most like a samurai" which is what they had in mind while creating and developing him. Mitsurugi's character was inspired by real-life swordsman Miyamoto Musashi. His backstory is also similar to Toshiro Mifune's character in the film The Seven Samurai, including that he was raised by farmers that were killed, became a swordsman, has a cocky and angry demeanor, and earned the title of a samurai by his valor and fighting prowess. Furthermore, his Soulcalibur V appearance is based on Mifune himself (who coincidentally has played Miyamoto Musashi several times in his career). Mitsurugi is one of only three characters to show physical signs of aging from the time skip, the others being Siegfried and Hilde. While developing Soulcalibur VI, Mitsurugi and Sophitia have been the first characters to be created and then used "as a foundation" for the decisions regarding the other characters' movements, visuals, and so forth.

Mitsurugi's proud and reckless attitude made him similar to Paul Phoenix from Namco's own Tekken universe, and his facial build is also alike that of Tekken's Kazuya Mishima. Setsuka's fighting style has common qualities with Mitsurugi's and Taki's. Mitsurugi's 2P costume in Soulcalibur II makes him resemble Haohmaru from SNK's Samurai Shodown series. Samanosuke from Capcom's later Onimusha: Warlords looks similar to Mitsurugi from the first Soulcalibur.

In Soul Edge, Mitsurugi and Hwang are very similar with the exception of a few attacks. In later games, both characters have been given new attacks, but Hwang ended up keeping most of the ones that both had used. Mitsurugi fights quite differently in the Soulcalibur games when compared to Soul Edge. In both the Tekken and the Soulcalibur series, Yoshimitsu borrows some of Mitsurugi's moves while Mitsurugi borrowing one of his from Tekken.

Gameplay 
Ultra Game Players guide to Soul Edge, which recommended him for his overall balance, combos and speed, states: "One of the more popular characters, Mitsurugi is also one of the easiest characters to use. Since he is so well-rounded, [players] should use him with a more aggressive, offensive style in mind." Das offizielle PlayStation Magazin opined he is the best all-rounder in Soul Edge and ideal to learn the basics. According to Computer and Video Games, Mitsurugi "is the 'average' fighter of Soul Edge, but has the potential to blossom into the most lethal fighter in the game." Overall, the magazine recommended him as a "solid character for both the beginners and masters alike." In the opinion of top British player of Soulcalibur, Martin Casey, Mitsurugi was the best character in this game.

Electronic Gaming Monthly opined Mitsurugi in Soulcalibur II "is most effective when played aggressively, pressing the attack with his katana whenever possible. He has a couple of alternate stances, a potent, unblockable low attack, and dangerous juggle moves." EGM recommended him for beginners and "button mashers". Conversely, GamePro's guide to Soulcalibur II listed his strong points as being "an excellent defensive character, very agile, and with a great side step and good reach," but offset by his "poor long range offensive options" and a necessity to "master a lot of moves to make use of his pros." Noting his very high popularity in that game, GameSpy's guide states Mitsurugi "is one of the characters that benefit a lot from the new systems" in Soulcalibur II and "while he may not have the best sidestep in the game, his ability to contain opponents and snuff them out makes him absolutely fearsome."

According to IGN, "Whereas most SC fighters are either nimble little backstabbers or giant, hulking brutes, Mitsurugi strikes a nice balance between power and agility. He isn't always the easiest character to dominate with, but experienced players often gravitate towards this wandering samurai for a good reason." The battle director of Soulcalibur VI said that in this game Mitsurugi can be used by the players with a wide range of skill, from beginner to advanced.

Reception 
Mitsurugi, declared the "coolest of all Soulcalibur characters" by the Official Dreamcast Magazine UK in 1999, has become and then remained a popular fan favourite and even arguably most iconic character in the Soulcalibur series. He was initially received so well that the original plan for the sequel to Soul Edge, codenamed "Soul Edge 2" (not to be mistaken with a later another project of the same working title that later became Soulcalibur V), was to have an all-new cast except only him. In a 2002 official poll by Namco prior to the release of Soulcalibur II regarding their favorite character, Mitsurugi placed ninth with 2.5% of the tally, tied with Siegfried. In a 2012 "battle royale" popularity contest of iconic fighting game characters in Pembroke Daily Observer, he won against Iori Yagami but was defeated by Liu Kang. In another official Namco poll, 13 years later in 2015, Mitsurugi placed third overall as the most popular male character.

Mitsurugi has been nominated to Ultra Game Players' 1997 Ultra Awards as one of the four characters in the category "Videogame Hunk" and Kotaku later included him among the most attractive game characters of the 1990s. In 2002, Official Xbox Magazine called him "the best Soul Calibur guy ever." In 2008, Mitsurugi was ranked number seven top Soulcalibur fighter by IGN. Gizmodo Japan included him among top ten swordsmen in video games. Nathan Ditum from PlayStation Official Magazine – UK chose him as his personal favourite out of the cast of Soulcalibur V. In 2013, Complex ranked him as the second best character in the series regarding his gameplay options, especially the balance.

See also 
 List of Soulcalibur characters

References

Fantasy video game characters
Fictional people of Sengoku-period Japan
Fictional mercenaries in video games
Fictional Japanese people in video games
Fictional kenjutsuka
Fictional characters from Chūgoku
Fictional swordfighters in video games
Male characters in video games
Namco protagonists
Orphan characters in video games
Role-playing video game characters
Soulcalibur series characters
Video game characters introduced in 1995